Armstrong Peak is a peak,  high, standing  southeast of Mount Codrington in Enderby Land of East Antarctica.

Discovery and naming
Armstrong Peak was mapped by Norwegian cartographers from aerial photographs taken by the Lars Christensen Expedition, 1936–37, and named "Austnuten" (the east peak). The peak was re-photographed by Australian National Antarctic Research Expeditions (ANARE) in 1956. An astrofix was obtained nearby in December 1959 by J.C. Armstrong, ANARE surveyor at Mawson Station, for whom the feature was renamed by the Antarctic Names Committee of Australia in 1960.

References

External links
 Australian Antarctic Division
 Australian Antarctic Gazetteer
 Australian Antarctic Names and Medals Committee (AANMC)
 Scientific Committee on Antarctic Research (SCAR)
 PDF Map of the Australian Antarctic Territory
 Mawson Station
 ANARE Club

Mountains of Enderby Land